is a fictional superhero and is the second tokusatsu hero launched by the Ultra Series and, by extent, Tsuburaya Productions. His appearance succeeds both the first Ultra Warrior Ultraman, and his superior, Zoffy, and is officially the third Ultra Warrior from Nebula M78, the Land of Light.

Ultraseven first appeared as the eponymous titular character alongside his "human form" Dan Moroboshi on the 1967-1968 Japanese television series, Ultraseven, which ran for 48 episodes. This series was preceded by Tsuburaya's first Kyodai Hero genre series, Ultraman. While both series shared the same genre with very similar heroes, there was originally no relation between the two. It was not until the third TV series The Return of Ultraman was created four years later that both Ultraman and Ultraseven came together into the same story. This event cemented Tsuburaya Productions' decision to have the Ultra Series continue to follow the trend of focusing on an Ultraman (or Ultra Warrior) with each new entry. Alongside Ultraman, Ultraseven himself enjoyed a long series of popularity and has continued to appear in various works from the Ultra Series. His notable appearances outside his original series were in Ultraman Leo, where he served as the mentor of the titular hero and was revealed to be the father of Ultraman Zero in the 2009 film Mega Monster Battle: Ultra Galaxy. Unlike Ultraman, Seven's popularity gave him the chance to star in other successive shows which were meant to be sequels of his own series such as Heisei Ultraseven and Ultraseven X. Ultraseven also has a lot of popular trademarks that are still memorable: his Eye Slugger, Beam Lamp and Capsule Monsters.

Ultraseven's grunts and voice were provided by Kohji Moritsugu during the series, who was also Dan Moroboshi's (his human form) actor. His suit actor was Kōji Uenishi in all episodes except in episodes 14 and 15, where he was temporarily replaced by Eiichi Kikuchi.

Character conception
Similar to Ultraman, Ultraseven's original concept was also meant to have him as an antagonist.

Ultraseven's design was made by Tohl Narita, who also did the design for Ultraman, while using the aspect of western armor under the conception of a warrior. Ultraseven's original color was meant to be blue, but due to the wish of toy developers, the color was changed to red. In contrast to a tall body archetype which was previously based on Bin Furuya, Ultraseven's body suit was designed to be able fit an average-sized human, like his suit actor Koji Uenishi. A second plan for the series was to rename it  and focus on a hero named , an Alien R/human hybrid who disguises himself as a man named Dan Moroboshi, a member of the Ultra Guard, and will transform into Redman to fight against alien threats. Eventually, the name "Ultraseven" was decided as a reference to the number of members of the Ultra Guard team.

In Ultraman Leo, Kohji Moritsugu's (Dan Moroboshi's original actor) character was meant to be , the MAC captain who was the only person to recognize Gen Ohtori's identity as Ultraman Leo, and would train him in his fight against monsters. However, Kohji himself hesitated to take the role, knowing that many viewers would mistake the character for Dan, and in the end Tetsutaro was changed to Dan Moroboshi, who returned to Earth.

In Ultraseven X, Ultraseven was designed by Yasushi Torisawa. Torisawa described his own version as "Ultraseven with Ultraman's strength" or "the strongest Ultraseven". The reason for this redesigning was never revealed, however.

Naming
Prior to his arrival on Earth, Seven was Space Garrison star charter called . He received the titular name "Ultraseven" by his human form Dan, who enlisted into the Ultra Guard as the sixth member and later dubbed his alter-ego as the Ultra Guard's honorary "seventh member".

This was meant to have his identity remain hidden until the series' finale.

This mistake is acknowledged in Ultraman Ginga Theater Special: Ultra Monster Hero Battle Royal!, during which Kenta Watarai transformed into Seven and called himself this before being corrected by Tomoya/Ultraman.

History

Showa era
Upon his arrival, he saves the life of a young mountain climber named Jiro Satsuma, who nearly falls to his death after cutting his line to save a fellow climber. Instead of merging with him, as Ultraman did with SSSP member Shin Hayata, Observer 340 morphs himself into a duplicate of the unconscious Jiro. However, he named his human form Dan Moroboshi to avoid confusion.

During his debut in the series, he appeared as a wanderer who assisted the Ultra Guard in foiling a kidnapping syndicate run by the Alien Cool. Reveling using his true form, 340 killed Alien Cool and destroyed the alien's saucer. Dan later enlisted into the Ultra Guard for his attribution as "Ultra Six" and he would later rename his giant alter-ego Ultraseven for being the honorary "seventh" member of the team. Following this, Dan and the Ultra Guard would fight against alien invaders and foil their plans either as himself or Ultraseven, though he would rely upon his Capsule Monsters in certain occasions where he found himself unable to transform.

In certain episodes, Seven would find himself in a moral dilemma concerning an alien race, such as in episode 6, which involves a misunderstanding between humans and the people from the planet Pegassa, who mistakenly believed that Earth was advanced enough to prevent collision with their floating city. In episode 26, Seven had to fight against a survivor of the destroyed planet Gyeron. In episode 42, a race called the Nonmalt claimed themselves to be the true Earth inhabitants and tried to usurp humanity; although the operation ended with the race's genocide, Seven still felt guilty for the decision that he had made. His biggest defeat in the series was in episode 39, during which the Alien Guts had Seven captured and crucified, wanting to take over the Earth once its protector was defeated. Eventually, it took the efforts of Ultra Guard for Seven to be freed and finally put an end to the alien's schemes in the next episode.

In the two-part final episode, Seven's superior arrived and told him to return to the Land of Light due to injuries he had sustained over the time he spent battling on Earth. The superior warned that if Moroboshi underwent several more transformations, the strain would cause him to run out of energy and die. Caught between his people on the Land of Light and the humans he sought to protect, Seven chose to disregard the order to return home after the Alien Ghose commenced their own invasion of Earth. His injuries greatly affected his fighting prowess against the Ghose's invasion monster Pandon, and it again took the Ultra Guard's help for Seven to muster up the strength to kill the monster. During this event, his identity was revealed by member Annie to the rest of the Ultra Guard members as they watched him fight Pandon. Seven managed to defeat Pandon by severing its two heads and right arm with his Eye Slugger, only for the Ghose to repair Pandon's damage and send it into battle again. With his energy almost completely depleted, Seven fought against Pandon in a climactic fight, this time killing it for good, and managed to return to the Land of Light with no time to spare, not even being able to say goodbye to the Ultra Guard.

Subsequent appearance in later Showa Ultra Series
Ultraseven appeared in later works of the Ultra Series played by various voice and suit actors. Although Kohji Moritsugu did reprise his role as Dan and Seven, there are other occasions where he was voiced by other voice actors.
The Return of Ultraman (1971): His first appearance is in episode 18, where he presented Jack with the Ultra Bracelet, which would become Jack's weapon through the series' course. He returned in episode 38 alongside Ultraman to rescue the captured Ultraman Jack, who was defeated by Alien Nackle. In episode 18, he was voiced by 
He was first shown witnessing Ace's fusion with Hokuto and Minami. In subsequent appearances, he supported Ace through several of his battles with Yapool's Choju (Super-Beasts), but in some episodes, he and the Ultra Brothers were captured by Yapool in episodes 13 and 14 and by Alien Hipporito in 26 and 27.
Ultraman Taro (1973): Appeared in episodes 1, 5, 25, 33, 34 and 40. In episode 1, he was among the Ultra Brothers that witnessed the fusion of Ultraman Taro and Kotaro. He assisted Taro in delivering the Tortoise family monster alongside Taro away from Earth and later delivered the Ultra Bell to the Ultra Tower in episode 25. In 33 and 34, he and the rest of the Ultra Brothers joined Taro on Earth while fighting against Alien Temperor. In episode 40, he fought Tyrant on Saturn, but was defeated in the end, partly due to the planet's cold atmosphere.
Ultraman Leo (1974): See below
Ultraman 80: Ultraseven's legacy was mentioned in episode 42 when a young boy who was injured by a group of bikers had his Minus Energy resonated to create the Delusion Ultraseven from his Seven doll. Takeshi (80) mistook the impostor as the real Seven before Ryoko (Yullian) saw through the deception.

Ultraman Leo
Dan Moroboshi returned in this 1974 series as the captain of MAC (Monster Attacking Crew) and a supporting protagonist to the series.

Originally, Dan fought as Seven when the second era of Earth invasions began, as he went against Alien Magma and his Gillas Monsters, Red and Black Gillas. However the two monsters were enough to defeat Seven, with his leg twisted and his Ultra Eye broken, Alien Magma was about to execute Seven, until the timely arrival of Ultraman Leo. Ultraman Leo was a prince from Nebula L-77 and, like Seven, he is also an Ultra-being, living on Earth disguised as a human named Gen Ohtori. Originally, Leo's main goal was to defeat Alien Magma as a revenge for destroying his homeworld in Nebula L-77, which leads to him ignoring Dan's orders and rushes to fight the Gilla Brothers. However, Gen's inexperience in combat results with him being no match against the twin monsters' spin attack, leading Dan to rescue him. Dan scolds Gen for putting his desire for vengeance over the humans he was supposed to protect and provided him with a training course, which allowed Leo to defeat the Gillas Brothers, though Alien Magma was able to escape.

Gen was enlisted into MAC and received further training from Dan whenever he found himself unable to defeat the monster-of-the-week. During Gen's fight as Leo, Dan still supported him using the Ultra Physic ability, a power from Seven. His twisted right leg injury from Black Gillas was inherited to his human form, which prompted him to use a Lofstrand crutch with a hidden smokescreen and rifle. In episode 29, he faced a dilemma when he comes across a woman with resemblance to Annie (Dan's former love interest), who is in fact Uringa's caretaker. In episode 34, he received a fourth capsule monster, the robot Sevenger, from Hideki Go/Ultraman Jack who had travelled to Earth to receive the broken Ultra Eye and return it to the Land of Light to be fixed. Jack also assisted Leo in fighting against Ashuran, an alien that followed him to Earth.

Dan's final appearance was in episode 40, which was also the episode that debuted the Flying Saucer Life Forms led by Commander Black. Silver Bloome, the first Flying Saucer Life Form, destroyed MAC headquarters in order to remove all means of resistance against Commander Black's invasion, simultaneously killing all MAC members, even those who tried to escape. Seeing MAC at its end and having taught Gen all he could, Dan parted ways with Gen and vanished, leaving Gen to escape from the destroyed base as Leo. In the final episode, a fully healed Seven contacted Gen in his dream and offered him a place in the Land of Light following the conclusion of his fight with Black End, the final Flying Saucer Life Form he faced.

How Dan/Seven escaped the destruction of MAC Headquarters was not properly explained until years later in a Ultraman Mebius novel, it was revealed that he was teleported away by the Mother of Ultra. She healed his injuries from the Gillas Brothers' attack and presented Dan with the finally fixed Ultra Eye that allowed him to transform back into Seven once more. He was later promoted to his current rank  of the Space Garrison.

Heisei era

Heisei Ultraseven
This series of direct-to-video films that features a re-imagined version of Ultraseven, which involves the titular hero being the only Ultra Warrior to set foot on Earth. However, this claim is made ambiguous, as the first film, Ultraseven - Operation: Solar Energy unveiled images of Guesra, Alien Baltan II and Oil Drinker.

In the NTV Specials (1994), Seven returned from Nebula M78 30 years after leaving Earth, but crash-landed and collapsed to his fatigue after being attacked while on his way to planet Ultra. As it seemed that Earth was finally at peace, another string of invasions suddenly arrived, starting with the return of Alien Pitt, who wanted to destroy the comatose Seven before he reawakened. However, their efforts were in vain, and Seven thwarted their invasion plan by killing their monster Eleking III and their spaceship, at the same time rescuing Anne's son, Dan. Seven also fought against Alien Metron and his monster Dinosaur.

In the 30th Anniversary Trilogy, Dan Moroboshi assisted the new generation members of the Ultra Guard by posing as their rookie member, Masaki Kazamori, and had the real person stored in an empty capsule. Although he becomes aware of the fact that Dan is trying to help them, Masaki at first sees him as a nuisance until he was revealed to be his idol, Ultraseven. After Masaki was freed from his capsule, Shigeru Furuhashi (Dan's old colleague in the Ultra Guard) sometimes mistook Masaki for Dan in disguise as the boy.

During The Final Chapters arc (1999), after Masaki nearly dies after allowing himself to be almost killed, due to Alien Valkyrie in his body, Seven fused with him in a similar manner to the merge between Ultraman and Shin Hayata. Although Masaki is in control of his body, Seven/Dan would use him as a medium of communication at certain occasions. Although the TDF members had signed peace treaty contracts with multiple alien races, some of them began to attack the Earth, prompting Masaki to borrow Seven's power. Seven also faced King Joe II, Alien Pedan's former invasion robot, which the TDF tried to reprogram until its original programming activated and it went rogue. The sixth and final movie of this arc had Masaki's identity as, and relationship to, Seven being exposed to the public and faced with another crisis, which involves the Nonmalt (a race of subterraneans that claimed to be the true residents of Earth) trying to reclaim Earth once more by exposing the atrocities made by the TDF (which involves killing their undersea civilization) in the past via the Omega Files. Although the Nonmalt manage to prove their claims and the fact that a civil war on Earth is about to start, Masaki/Seven had no choice but to interfere in the battle (an action that is against the rules of the Space Garrison) by trespassing on the TDF base to retrieve the Omega Files and stop Zabangi. With Masaki fully healed, he returned to Nebula M78.

Years later in EVOLUTION, Seven was imprisoned in the Horsehead Nebula for his interference in the war of civilizations, but the Dragonic Saucer (through Satomi's sacrifice) freed him when Alien Garut tried to invade Earth by tampering with the Akashic records. Seven bonded with Kazamori once more and helped the Ultra Guards with facing against multiple alien threats, but was labelled as a traitor for defending a Plant Life Form, which claimed to be Earth's successor until Garut's fabrications were exposed. Seven faced the alien and his monster vanguard Gaimos, and received an encouragement from Satomi's spirit to arise once again and eliminate the alien. In the end, Kazamori retained his connection to Seven and left for parts unknown.

Kohji Moritsugu returned to provide Seven's grunt in this series, but starting from EVOLUTION onward, it was provided by Katsuyuki Yamazaki, Kazamori's voice actor.

Subsequent appearance in later Heisei Ultra Series
Ultraman Max (2005): In episode 24, Ultraseven's fight with Alien Metron was mentioned as the original alien survived but decided to depart from Earth in good terms. Although this television series supposedly taking place in a different universe, writer Yuji Kobayashi confirmed that and also revealed that the entire episode 24 is a one-time exception to this rule.
Ultraman Mebius & Ultraman Brothers (2006): In this movie, it was revealed that Ultraseven, Ultraman, Ultraman Jack and Ultraman Ace had sealed Yapool and his Chouju, U-Killersaurus, beneath the lake of Kobe at the cost of most of their energy. In the end, they assumed human lives, Ultraseven returning to his human guise as Dan Moroboshi. 20 years later, Dan approaches Mirai Hibino (the human form of Ultraman Mebius) alongside his comrades, giving him advice after being shaken due to unable to save a young boy in the past. The human Ultra Brothers later witnessed Mebius' battle against an alien group that had arrived to revive Yapool. When Mebius was unable to handle the invaders, the Ultra Brothers had no choice but to transform again for the first time in 20 years. But even after Mebius was rescued, they quickly fell prey to the aliens' trap and were used to unseal Yapool before they could stop them. While fighting against Yapool/U-Killersaurus, Zoffy and Ultraman Taro came to their aid and replenished their energies. With the Ultra Brothers united, they combined with Mebius to form Mebius Infinity to defeat Yapool and freed Kobe.
Ultraman Mebius (2006): Following the events of the movie, Ultraseven returned in episode 46 and 50 of the series. After Ultraman Mebius was defeated by Growzam (an Alien Groza member of the Dark Four Heavenly Kings), Dan approaches Konomi and reassured her in her abilities. When GUYS tried to rescue Mebius, Dan joined the battle as Ultraseven to buy them some time and later joined forces with Mebius against Glozam. As it seemed that Glozam would be immortal to the attacks, Konomi's METEOR is able to eliminate Growzam's remains and permanently kill him. During Alien Empera's invasion, Seven had a telepathic contact with Konomi and was among the Ultra Warriors that cleanse the Sun from Alien Empera's sunspot.
Superior Ultraman 8 Brothers (2008): In this work, Ultraseven is also an alternate universe character who came to Earth alongside his comrades, Ultraman, Ultraman Jack and Ultraman Ace. Having arrived on Earth, they assumed the lives of mundane civilians, with Ultraseven disguising himself as restaurateur Dan Moroboshi, having married Anne but having lived on Earth for a long time, and eventually forgotten their actual identities. This, however, changes when the safety of their Earth was threatened by unnamed dark figures, until their wives reminded them who they really were, allowing Dan and the others to regain their memories and powers as Ultra Warriors, assisting the alternate Heisei Ultra Warriors and Ultraman Mebius (the prime reality version which was forcefully brought into their universe) against their enemy. In the end, after Daigo completed the space vessel which was meant to bring its passengers to the Land of Light, Dan and his comrades join in along with their wives, as Dan and Anne rode a space vessel that resembles the Ultra Guard's Ultra Hawk 1.
Ultraseven X (2007): See below

Ultraseven X
After aliens from an alternate universe attempted to invade the Nebula M78 universe, Ultraseven dashed in and bonded with Jin, an amnesiac DEUS agent. Elea, Jin's comrade witnessed the event as the giant of light offered his help by combining with a nearly died Jin to save his life, at the expense of Seven's consciousness and Jin's past memories. He also warned that should he regain his consciousness, this may endanger Jin's life as well.

As Agent J of DEUS, Jin uses Ultraseven's power to stop alien threats that are bent on either conquering the planet or simply endangering the civilians. During the series' climax, it was revealed that DEUS and the entire population is controlled by a larger group of alien rulers who successfully invaded their planet, having subdued humanity to the state of Utopia, and used DEUS (by extension, Jin's connection to Ultraseven) as enforcers to their rule. As Jin, Elea and agents K and S were labelled traitors for discovering the dark truth, Jin used Ultraseven's power for the last time to fight against three Mecha Grakyess, but once nearly defeated, Seven's true consciousness resurfaced and easily eliminated his opponents. He soon dashed in and destroyed the alien rulers' hive before rescuing agents K and S. After the event, Seven separated from Jin and headed back to his homeworld as he re-assumed the form of Dan Moroboshi, reuniting with Anne.

Galaxy Crisis era

Mega Monster Battle: Ultra Galaxy
Ultraseven reappeared in this film, playing a major role in the plot when he was revealed to be the father of Ultraman Zero. Ages ago, concealing their familial ties from his son, Seven caught Zero attempting to steal the Plasma Spark. Stopping Zero in time and temporarily banishing him from Planet Ultra, Seven sent Zero off-world to be trained by Ultraman Leo to keep Zero from ending up like Ultraman Belial. Following Belial's escape, Seven was among the Ultras who attempted to stop the fallen Ultra Warrior from stealing the Plasma Spark. Seven and Ultraman managed to save themselves from being frozen as they and Mebius recruited Rei and together raced towards the Monster Graveyard to fight against Belial's army. Although Mebius reminded Seven that they could recruit Zero to their side, he refused, as Zero's training is still in progress.

However, in the middle of the battle, Belial brainwashed Rei into being his servant, and by extension had Gomora attack the Ultra Brothers. Ultraseven received the most critical hit and was mortally wounded. Although the arrival of Ultraman Dyna and ZAP Spacy managed to get Rei back to his senses, an exhausted Seven made a final attempt by throwing his Eye Slugger as a distress call before collapsing to his injuries. The Eye Slugger arrived when Zero's training was completed and had his relation to Ultraseven undisclosed. This reveal prompted him to race towards the Monster Graveyard, but he was too late, as his father died in his arms before he helped the resistance win against Belial's army. After the battle, the Plasma Spark was returned to its position and unfroze the Land of Light and its residents. While Zero was grieving for his father's death, Seven returned and reunited with him.

Subsequent appearances in later Galaxy Crisis era stories
For the following appearances below, refer to List of Mega Monster Battle characters#Ultra Brothers:
Ultra Galaxy Mega Monster Battle: Never Ending Odyssey (2008): Long ago, Seven fought against a rogue Armored Darkness on the planet Hammer and lost to it, but before he could be assimilated by the armor, Seven separated the Eye Slugger from him and used his remaining strength to seal the Armored Darkness. Rei and the ZAP Spacy members stumbled upon Seven's Eye Slugger, which shrunk to his size as his temporary weapon and eventually received a vision of Seven's past, which led him to the awakened Armored Darkness. As the ZAP Spacy and Rei's monsters faced the giant sentient armor, a crack was made on its helmet, revealing a dormant Seven. Knowing what to do, Rei launched the Eye Slugger, which reawakened Seven and enabled him to shatter the armor from within. As a thank-you gift, Ultraseven lent Rei his Miclas, though the red giant reclaimed it during the last episode.
Mega Monster Battle: Ultra Galaxy (2009): See above.
Ultraman Zero: The Revenge of Belial (2010): During the Darklops' invasion, Seven and Zero help fend off against the army and managed to destroy them. He was later among the Space Garrison members that studied the Darklops' remains and presented Zero with the Ultra Zero Bracelet, which gives him three chances to transform in an alternate world and is among the Ultra Warriors that donated their light to Zero's travel sphere so that the youth could travel to an alternate universe.
Ultraman Saga (2012): When Zero went to another alternate space to battle Alien Bat, Ultraseven and the other Ultra Brothers sensed that Zero was in danger and worried for the youth. In the director's cut version of the movie, the Ultra Brothers arrived on to assist Ultraman Saga in fighting against Hyper Zetton's revived monster army. Ultraseven fought against King Pandon, a monster based on his past enemy Pandon.

New Generation Heroes era
For the appearances below, refer to List of Ultraman Ginga characters#Ultra Brothers:
Ultraman Ginga (2013): Alongside the Ultra Brothers, Ultraseven was among the combatants of the Dark Spark War, fighting against King Pandon but soon cursed into a Spark Doll by Dark Lugiel when he and the rest of the Space Garrisons tried to protect Taro (thus making him the only Spark Doll to retain sentience in the series). His Spark Doll soon fell into Dark Lugiel's hands and was used by Seiichirō Isurugi alongside Ultraman and against Ultraman Ginga before the man was defeated, allowing Hikaru (Ginga's host) to recover it. A reformed Seiichirō used the Ultraseven Spark Doll again alongside Chigusa (Ultraman) and Kenta (Ultraman Tiga) to hold off Super Grand King for Ginga to free Misuzu. In the aftermath of Ginga's battle with Lugiel, Ultraseven and the other Spark Dolls were lifted from their curse and returned to space.
Ultraman Ginga Theater Special: Ultra Monster Hero Battle Royal! (2014): Ultraseven was among the sketches that Tomoya drew in his book until a strange cosmic energy wave took effect, thus materializing Ultraman and other sketches into Spark Dolls. Ultraseven was used by Kenta when he and his friends tried to play using the Ultra Warrior Spark Dolls, until software bugs created a group of five dark Ultramen for them to fight. Kenta/Ultraseven fights against Chaosroid S and wins by firing his Wide Shot.
Ultraman Ginga S (2014): As revealed in episode 54 of Shin Ultraman Retsuden, Ultraseven and the rest of the Ultra Brothers donated their powers to Taro when he raced to Earth after detecting a new threat. In Ultraseven's case, he donated his Emerium Ray and Wide Shot, which soon became one of Ultraman Ginga Strium's powers. After his job on Earth ended, Taro returned the loaned powers back to the Ultra Brothers.
Ultraman X (2016): Ultraseven was mentioned by Hikaru to explain to Daichi about the good monsters, as Seven has used three monsters to aid him whenever he was occupied in battle. The episode briefly featured him in person alongside his Capsule Monsters.
Ultraman Orb The Movie (2017) Seven appeared during the climax of the film as he transformed from Dan Moroboshi and assisted Orb Trinity and other nearby Ultras against Sadeath and Diabolic. Alongside the other Ultras (except for Orb), he departed once the battle ended. His appearance in the film is meant to celebrate the 50th anniversary of his series.
Ultra Fight Orb (2017): Seven, Zoffy and Jack had sent Zero to investigate the mysterious darkness from the planet Yomi. Fearing that something had happened to his son, the three flew off to the planet and save him from four revived monsters. After Orb's failure in pursuing Reibatos, he and his son trained Orb for 10 years and gave the Ultra Warrior his Ultra Fusion Card, granting access to the Emerium Slugger when used in unison with Zero's card. After Reibatos' death, he watched Orb leave the Land of Light.
Ultraman Geed (2017): Alongside the Ultra Brothers, Ultraseven participated in a fight against Belial before he was caught in the Crisis Impact. Following the Crisis Impact, Seven's power became a Little Star that inhabited Toru Honda before it transferred into Geed. Alongside Leo Capsule, Riku would utilize them to transform into Ultraman Geed Solid Burning.
Ultraman Geed The Movie (2018):
Ultraman R/B (2018):
Ultra Galaxy Fight: New Generation Heroes (2019):

Reiwa Era
Seven, Leo and Zero Medals were given to Ultraman Z following Ultraman Zero's banishment into an alternate dimension. The three Medals allow Z to assume the space martial art form, Alpha Edge.

Profile
Some of Ultraseven's statistics below were mentioned in the original series and were brought up in magazines and official websites. There are also certain succeeding series that deviate from his original statistics:
Height: micro ~ 40 m (Alien Guts mentioned that his maximum height is actually 50 m)
Weight: 35,000 t
Flight Speed: Mach 7
Birthplace: Nebula M78, Land of Light
Human Form: Dan Moroboshi, based on civilian Jiro Satsuma
Weakness: Cold temperature
Year Debut: 1967
First Appearance: Ultraseven Episode 1 (1967)

Description
As the official website of Tsuburaya Productions stated: "[Ultraseven] Visited the Earth from his homeworld Nebula M78, the Land of Light, after its beauty captivated him and fought the threats of invaders after witnessing the Earthlings' bravery and kindness. His main techniques are Emerium Ray, Wide Shot and his weapon, the Eye Slugger that can be controlled freely in mid-air. His human form on Earth is Dan Moroboshi of the Ultra Guard from the Terrestrial Defense Forces (TDF). He is a member of the Ultra Brothers and the father of Ultraman Zero."

Transformation
By drawing the Ultra Eye to his eyes, Seven's face develops first, before his entire Protector materializes on his body and forms the entire figure of Ultraseven.

Similar to Ultraman's Beta Capsule, Dan stored his Ultra Eye within the breast pocket of his Ultra Guard uniform. This device often had the tendency to be lost, stolen or removed from him during the series' course, prompting Dan to use his Capsule Monsters as placeholders before he would recover the Ultra Eye.

In episode 1 of Ultraman Leo, the Ultra Eye was broken from the ensuing battle against Alien Magma and the Giras Brothers. This rendered Dan fully untransformable and was forced to rely on the Ultra Physic to assist Leo in his battles. The Ultra Eye was later claimed by Ultraman Jack and brought to the Land of Light when the Mother of Ultra rescued Dan from Silver Bloome's attack, healing his injuries and presenting him the fixed Ultra Eye for him to become Seven once more.

In Heisei Ultraseven, the transformation scene also features Kazamori in place of Dan after the latter possesses the youth. In Ultraseven X, the Ultra Eye also received a drastic change in response of Ultraseven's redesign for the show.

Body features
: A small lamp located on his forehead, which mainly functions to launch the Emerium Ray. Unlike Ultraman and other Ultra Warriors succeeding him, Seven does not bounded to the three-minute rule, due to his Protector's function of constantly absorbing sunlight. The Beam Lamp only flashes when Seven is in critical danger or has his energy depleted, such as in episode 25 after a long exposure to cold temperature. When having his energy recharged by another Ultra Warrior, the donated energy would go to the Beam Lamp instead, in place of his lack of a Color Timer. The reason that he lacked the Color Timer is due to his early job as an observer with no combat purpose, hence he was devoid of a specialized surgery to install said device.
: Silver armor on Seven's chest, which functions as solar panels, allowing him to withstand for a longer period in combat. Episode 40 revealed that the Protector had smaller square holes that absorbed the sunlight.

Other forms

 is the heavily redesigned appearance of Ultraseven after he entered an alternate world to stop a group of aliens from invading his own. Although Seven X has no change in statistics, his entire physical appearance changed into a more muscular form. Unlike Ultraseven in most of his battles, Seven X showed himself to be able to fight and concluded his battles instantly when against alien opponents. This fighting stance is made from Jin's prowess, due to the real Seven remaining comatose for Jin to continue alive. When Seven regained control of his body, he displayed better fighting skills, able to outmaneuver three Mecha Grakyess and destroy an entire colony of alien hives, something which Jin is incapable of. This form only appeared in Ultraseven X and has not appeared in any other succeeding media ever since.
: Featured in Superior 8 Ultraman Brothers. Seven and the alternate Ultra Warriors received strength from the citizens' hopes and gained a power boost that was identical to Tiga's Glitter Tiga. His attack, combined with the alternate Ultras, was called , made by combining their original finisher attacks.
 is the corrupted form of Ultraseven, which first appeared during the events of Ultraman Ginga. After Seiichirō Isurugi was given the Spark Dolls of Ultraman and Ultraseven, the  given to him allowed the man to assume the corrupted forms of the two Ultra Warriors, Ultraman Dark and Ultraseven Dark, respectively. His appearance is identical to Ultraseven, but with black colors replacing the original red, and Ultraseven Dark's eyes shining red. His attacks retain the same name and power statistics, though they appear to be darker. After Seiichirō's defeat as Ultraseven Dark by Ginga, Hikaru claimed the purified Spark Dolls of Ultraman and Ultraseven. The suit of Ultraseven Dark was reused from Ultraseven Geist, another evil doppelgänger of Ultraseven that appeared in certain stage shows. Also, the third volume of the Ultraman Ginga's Blu-ray DVD release stated that his conception was based on Imitation Ultraseven, a mechanical replica created by Alien Salome from episode 42 of Ultraseven.

Powers and abilities
Like Ultraman, Seven's fighting skills revolves around the use of brute strength and only uses beam attacks when needed. Although most of the Ultra Warriors demonstrated this, Seven is the first to demonstrate the ability to change sizes from giant to human size, even to microscopic size, which was used against Darii when it possessed a human from within.

This attack can be performed in either two positions: Type A, which had his fingers cross over his forehead and Type B, with his left arm placed in front of his shoulder. This attack can be used in a manner of rapid fire bullets, which he used to decimate a fleet of invading ships (ep. 43) and reprogramming, which he used to reprogram his Windom after being hacked and manipulated by Alien Kanan. Alternatively, he can also use , which involves placing his arms in an L-style position. These ray attacks had the equation of "M2SH3GWAB1", based on Alien Salome's analysis.

It has been incorrectly referred to as an "Ice Lugger" by various sources. This name was coined during the early pre-production on the series, which was going to be called Ultra Eye (Urutora Ai), hence the "Eye Slugger".

Seven retained this attack as Dan Moroboshi, which proved to be useful when he was rendered as a human in Ultraman Leo.

Human hosts and forms

Dan Moroboshi

 is the human form of Ultraseven when on Earth. His bravery inspires Seven to use him as a basis of his human form and he names himself Dan to avoid confusion.

Dan stopped in Japan and was involved as a volunteer assisting the Ultra Guard against Alien Cool's invasion scheme. His attribution allowed him to be recruited into the Ultra Guard. From that day on, Dan assisted the Ultra Guard in foiling multiple extraterrestrial threats and used either his Capsule Monsters or his true form as Ultraseven when the situation called for it. During that time, Dan sometimes conflicted with the consequences of his actions as shown when humans used the planet Gyeron as a testing ground or for Captain Kaoru Kiriyama to hastily commencing a total genocide on the Nonmalt. He also had a love interest named Anne, who often became his partner during missions. Said woman is also the first person that discovered Dan's true identity, but was not surprised by this, seeing that both Dan and Seven are mostly the same.

Dan returned in succeeding entries of the Ultra Series, but among them, his major involvement was in Ultraman Leo as the captain of MAC. He was also Gen Ohtori-Ultraman Leo's instructor after becoming incapable of transforming into Seven due to the injuries from fighting Alien Magma and his Giras monsters. As a MAC officer, Dan's main weapon is a rifle-smokescreen hidden within his Lofstrand crutch. His final appearance is in episode 40, as the Mother of Ultra teleported him back to the Land of Light before he was killed by Silver Bloome.

Masaki Kazamori

 is a rookie member of the Ultra Guard and is Seven's first human host in the franchise. First appearing in the 30th Anniversary Trilogy, Masaki's identity is always used by Dan, who wishes to help the new generation of the Ultra Guard from within. Although knowing his intention meant no harm, Kazamori initially viewed him as a nuisance until he was revealed to be the former's childhood hero, Ultraseven.

During The Final Chapters special, Kazamori was gravely injured when he allowed himself to be killed by Dan after Alien Valkyrie attempted to possess him. Seven soon fused with him in a similar manner to Ultraman with Shin Hayata. Although Kazamori is in control of his actions, Seven would use him as a medium when he tried to communicate. During this, Kazamori worked in a similar manner to Dan during his time in the Ultra Guard, defending Earth as himself while using the Ultraseven persona when the time called for it. In the sixth and final chapter, Kazamori is detained by the TDF after being exposed for his connections to Seven. Fortunately, his comrades in the Ultra Guard help him escape as Dan briefly separated from him and discovered that the Nonmalt tried to commence a war on humanity after exposing their race for being the true invaders. After the battle, Dan/Seven separated from Kazamori and returned the boy after healing him from his previous injuries, while he returned to his homeworld to face the punishments for interfering in a civil war.

In EVOLUTION, Kazamori and Satomi retired from their service in the Ultra Guard and went on with their separate lives. Kazamori becomes a wanderer later on, but was forced into the battle again later on and reunited with Seven. Although helping the Ultra Guards again, he was later labelled as a traitor for defending a Plant Life Form, which claimed to be the Earth's successor until Alien Garut's fabrications were exposed. Seven faced the alien and his monster vanguard Gaimos, and received an encouragement from Satomi's spirit to arise once again and eliminate the alien. In the end, Kazamori retained his connection to Seven and left for parts unknown.

Jin

, or Agent J, is a DEUS agent is the protagonist of Ultraseven X. He is 25 years old in the series proper and drives a Cadillac SRX.

Jin was a DEUS agent who discovered that his world is ruled by a group of aliens and that their operation, the Aqua Project, is an invasion to another world. Alongside former Aqua Project worker Elea Saeki, the two were on the run from DEUS agents, until he was mortally injured during an attack. Ultraseven, who traveled into the alternate world, bonded with Jin at the expense of his memories and Seven's consciousness. Elea witnessed the event, but was alerted that should the giant regain consciousness, Jin may lose his life. After being rendered amnesiac, DEUS and the shadow rulers manipulated him to join the other agents and fought against alien threats. At certain times, Jin would use the Ultra Eye and transform into Ultraseven X (called by many as "the Red Giant") when needed, successfully eliminating his opponents in a matter of seconds.

After rediscovering a hidden conspiracy that shrouded his employer and the government, he reunited with Elea and, alongside fellow agents K and S, were on the run from other agents. Jin used Ultraseven's power for the last time to fight against three Mecha Grakyess but once nearly defeated, Seven's true consciousness resurfaced and easily eliminated his opponents. He soon dashed in and destroy the alien rulers' hive before rescuing agents K and S. After the event, Seven separated from Jin and headed back to his homeworld. When being asked who is the name of the giant, Jin replied that it is "Ultraseven".

Other hosts
In certain circumstances, Ultraseven possesses other people as substitute human hosts.
 In episode 33 and 34 of Ultraman Taro, the Ultra Brothers possessed the male ZAT officers in order to hide themselves from Alien Temperor, who was hunting them on Earth, and to teach Kotaro Higashi/Ultraman Taro not to be arrogant and to not rely on his brothers-in-arms too much. Ultraseven possessed the ZAT officer  and later a volleyball player once Temperor sees through their deception.
 In Ultraman Ginga, with Ultraseven transformed into a Spark Doll and under possession of Dark Lugiel, his doll was among those in Dark Lugiel's possession. It later ends up in Hikaru's possession, Ultraman would later be freed once Dark Lugiel was defeated, although another Ultraseven Spark Doll appeared certain times after the series:
 Ultraseven's original doll at first was given to  alongside Ultraman's Spark Doll. Having been corrupted by Alien Nackle Gray, he used Ultraseven's corrupted power, turning Ultraman and Ultraseven into the dark Ultra Warriors Ultraman Dark and Ultraseven Dark. He defeated Hikaru in their first encounter and invited him in his quest to rule over everything, but was rejected and defeated by Hikaru. Seiichirō's defeat had saved him from Gray's brainwashing and purified the two Ultra Warrior's Spark Dolls. He would later use the Ultraseven Spark Doll for good to assist Ultraman Ginga when his daughter Misuzu falls victim like he did.
 During the events of Ultraman Ginga Theater Special: Ultra Monster ☆ Hero Battle Royal!, Ultraseven's Spark Doll was among the copies which was created when Tomoya's sketchbook of Ultra Monsters was radiated by strange cosmic waves.  would later use the Spark Doll when playing with his comrades (even mistaking Ultraseven's name as Ultraman Seven until Tomoya corrected him), but later participated in a fight against a group of five evil Ultramen, facing Chaosroid S. Ultraseven and the other fake Spark Dolls later reverted into his sketchbook once the effects of the cosmic wave radiation dried out.

Capsule Monsters
 are monsters which are micronized and stored by Dan when he is unable to fight as Seven. Each monster is stored within capsules and can be summoned by throwing it in the mid-air, returning to their original heights and fight under the time limit of one minute. These monsters were not even strong enough to defeat the series' weekly antagonists and were usually acted as cannon fodder before Dan transformed into Seven. However, their greatest success was in Mega Monster Battle: Ultra Galaxy, when Miclas, Windom and Agira were able to destroy monsters sent to the frozen Land of Light by Belial, all while the Ultra Warriors were frozen and survivors like Seven, Ultraman and Mebius were rendered untransformed. Said battle as well is their first victory during their time under the servitude of Dan/Seven. In Ultraman Mebius, two of these monsters, Miclas and Windom, were duplicated into GUYS'  as alternatives for them to combat against giant threats, should no Ultra Warriors be able to help with the fighting on the scene.

The capsule containers are capable of shrinking its content to the size of 1 cm. It also functions as a healing chamber, which Dan uses after his Capsule Monsters were tired from their battle. This is also applied to Kazamori in episode 6 of Heisei Ultraseven.

Windom
 is a computer-guided metallic bird capsule monster from Planet Metal, first appeared in episode 1 of Ultraseven. Windom's main ability involves launching energy beam from its forehead and performing an acrobatic jump, but it is vulnerable to hacking and sabotages. For once, Alien Kanan managed to hack Windom and had the robot briefly act against Seven before he managed to reprogram it back to his side. Windom was destroyed in episode 39 after losing to Alien Guts and once more in Episode 6 of Heisei Ultraseven: The Final Chapters during its fight against Zabangi, but managed to recover later on. Its recent battle was in Mega Monster Battle: Ultra Galaxy, fighting and winning against Saramandora.

In Ultraman Mebius, Windom's data was saved into the Ultra Guard's file by GUYS and was used to create a Maquette Monster copy of it. This Windom was later improvised into  through the data of Zetton (Ultraman ep. 39), Pandon (Ultraseven ep. 48) and Black End (Ultraman Leo ep. 51). This variant sports a cannon on the left arm, which was used to launch fireball ammunition called .

Miclas
 is a buffalo-themed capsule monster that first appeared in episode 3 of Ultraseven. Miclas fights using its brute strength and thick hide and is capable of launching a heat ray from its mouth, but it is vulnerable to electricity and cold temperature. Its only combat history was against Eleking and Gander, being frozen by the latter in its final fight. In Heisei Ultraseven: The Final Chapters, Miclas' only battle was against Zabangi and, even with the assistance of Windom, both easily perished, although their remains were salvaged by Seven. In Never Ending Odyssey, it was briefly lend to Rei by Seven in gratitude for saving him from the Armored Darkness. Although initially a timid monster, Rei's encouragement allowed it to fight against multiple monsters and become the placeholder for Eleking after the latter's death. Miclas was reclaimed by Seven following the conclusion of the series. It returned, alongside other Capsule Monsters, in Mega Monster Battle: Ultra Galaxy and is shown to have finally developed a resilience to cold temperature while easily fending off against Bemstar.

In Ultraman Mebius, Miclas' date was saved into the Ultra Guard's file by GUYS and was used to create a Maquette Monster copy of it. This Miclas was later improvised into  through the data of Eleking (Ultraseven ep. 3), Neronga (Ultraman ep. 3) and Eledortus (Return of Ultraman ep. 15). This variant sported no aesthetic changes, but gained additional abilities to manipulate electricity and turn invisible.

Agira
 is a ceratopsian-themed capsule monster that first appeared in episode 32 of Ultraseven. Agira's main weapon is its cranial horn and its brute strength. Its only combat history was against Riggah and Imitation Ultraseven. Agira returned in Mega Monster Battle: Ultra Galaxy and fought against Dorako, using its cranial horn to successfully end the fight.

Sevenger
 is a robot stored within the Capsule Monster variant called  which only appeared in episode 34 of Ultraman Leo. It was the most versatile counterpart to the Capsule Monsters created in the Land of Light and was meant to be an alternative for Dan to fight with after his Ultra Eye was broken. However, while Ultraman Jack was escorting the ball to Earth, he was attacked by Ashuran and the ball was lost until it was recovered. During Ashuran's first attack, Dan used Sevenger and almost won against the invader, until it reached its time limit of one minute, giving Ashuran an opening to escape. This monster was never to be used again, due to its recharging time being 50 hours per one usage.

Cultural impact

Design basis
In the Ultra Series, Ultraseven's main body has become the basis for several of the succeeding Ultra Warriors onwards. This design can be seen in certain Ultras such as Ultraman Taro (whose suit was coincidentally modified into Delusion Ultraseven in Ultraman 80), Ultraman Leo, Ultraman Max and others.

In the 2016 Ultra Series Ultraman Orb, Dan Moroboshi's concept (being an Ultra Warrior in disguise of a wanderer) was passed on to Gai Kurenai, the series' main character. According to director Kiyotaka Taguchi, the "wandering protagonist" concept was already planned since the development of Ultraman Ginga S and it took two years for it to come into realization.

Parodies
Ultraseven, as well as his Capsule Monsters and the elements from his own series, has been referenced and parodied numerous times in popular culture; examples include:
Pokémon creator Satoshi Tajiri admitted that the famous Poké Ball concept is inspired from Ultraseven's Capsule Monster functions.
Among Near's toys in the manga/anime Death Note is a bootleg figure of Ultraseven.
Episode 15 of OVA Patlabor: The New Files bears multiple parodies and tributes to the final episodes of Ultraman and Ultraseven. The point of view character, Noa Izumi, transforms into Ingraman (parodying Ultraman and Ultraseven) and fights against Griffon (parodying Zetton), but loses to it and the Section 2 Division 2 members destroy it by themselves. In the end, Ingraman's bond with Noa was ended by Zero (parodying Zoffy) and Noa gains another life.
Dr. Slump features two minor characters, Nekotoraman and Nekotoraseven, on a theatrical poster pointed out by Senbei Norikami.
Chapter 11 of the original Dragon Ball manga features Chi-Chi, whose helmet is based on Ultraseven's head. She is capable of using attacks based on Ultraseven,
One of the characters of Sgt. Frog is Angol Mois, who faces a similar situation to Seven, modelling their human guise after witnessing a civilian whose actions captivated them. Coincidentally, the character that had her appearance copied by Mois, Asami, wears a hair clip that is designed after the Ultra Guard's insignia.
In the final episode of the anime adaptation of One-Punch Man, one of the captured Dark Matter Thieves is based on Windom.
In episode 285 of the anime adaptation of Gin Tama, a bootleg mask of Ultraseven can be seen on the background.
The fifth episode of the anime Dagashi Kashi has a character in Hotaru Shidare's imagination themed after Seven tasting a Sour Grape candy before falling down after succumbing to the candy's effect.
The prototype Mobile Suit MSM-08 Zogok (from Mobile Suit Gundam ZZ and Mobile Suit Gundam Unicorn) features multiple boomerang cutters which can be launched from its head. These weapons are likely based on Seven's Eye Slugger.
The 46th episode of the 2012 adaptation of Teenage Mutant Ninja Turtles has Anton Zeck with a combat suit, which allowed him to launch energy mohawks in a similar manner to Seven's Ultra Knock Tactic.

In other media
The following below refers to Ultraseven and Dan's non-canon appearance outside of TV, such as manga and novel adaptations:

Anime
Ultraseven's Capsule Monsters, Miclas, Windom and Agira, are reimagined as moe anthropomorphism and starred in an upcoming short anime Kaiju Girls, featuring them as 16-year-old high school girls.

Apps
In late 2013, LINE announced the second release of Ultraman stickers sold at the price of US$1.99. Seven was among the caricatures featured in the sets, alongside other Ultra Warriors and Ultra Monsters.

Manga

Ultraseven is one of the characters of a popular manga series, Ultraman Chotoshi Gekiden.
In the non-canon 2005 manga Ultraman Story 0 (:ja:ウルトラマンSTORY 0), Ultraseven tried to fight against Alien Pedan, who held the whole planet of Buffalo captive just to find the planet's monster, Miclas. After being defeated by King Joe, Seven reverted to his human form and was healed by the planet Buffalo's natives while searching for his lost Ultra Eye. When King Joe begins to attack the village, Miclas revealed itself and tried to fend off against the robot, but it was no match for the robot's strength and had its front horn ripped off. After finding the lost Ultra Eye, Seven transformed and fought King Joe with Miclas' help, who cleared the sky for Seven to recharge his energy. The injured Miclas was later brought to the Land of Light to be treated.
The 2011 Ultraman manga takes place in a non-canon alternate timeline, with Ultraman being the only Ultra Warrior to set foot on Earth. Dan Moroboshi is an alien disguised as a human and is reimagined as an insensitive, stoic, foul-mouthed officer of the SSSP, who views Ultraman as nothing more as an enforcer-like figure that instantly kills his opponents. This point-of-view is not shared with the main protagonist, Shinjiro, and is loosely based on the original Ultraseven's ruthless fighting skills. His Ultraman suit was later upgraded into Version 7.2 and received additional armaments in the form of another Spacium Sword, a pair of machine guns stored on his back and a pair of Wide Shot cannons on both of his arms. Within Netflix's anime adaptation, Dan is voiced by Takuya Eguchi and Liam O'Brien (anime) for the Japanese and English dubs respectively.

Novels
Another Genesis, a novel series launched in 2011, has Ultraseven's design drastically altered, resembling a knight and wielding a gigantic hatchet Eye Slugger. Following the destruction of the Land of Light, Seven worked by monitoring his former home world's shards and those who were affected by its radiation. He also approached himself to Blast, the novels' main character, and assisted him in fighting against an unknown alien.

Video games
Ultraseven is featured as one of the playable characters in the app game Monster Strike as part of the collaboration with the Ultra Series. When the players used the "Strike Shot", Ultraseven would initiate his strongest attack, the Eye Slugger.
Ultraseven is one of the playable characters in Ultraman Fighting Evolution Rebirth.
In the final, 17th level of City Shrouded in Shadow, Ultraseven fights the two-headed fire-breathing bird-like kaiju Pandon, his final adversary in the original series.

Reception

Critical commentary
During an interview with Kohji Moritsugu, Dan Moroboshi's actor and Ultraseven's voice actor, spoke about his period of acting on the series, which was a consecutive year with almost no rest. He was required to get up early at 5:00 am and return home at 11:00 pm. The hardest part of his time when acting was pretending to be facing giant alien attacks, since he had to imagine the alien first and was reminded to portray Ultraseven as an alien being in human form. In the scene where Dan drives the Ultra Guard patrol car Pointer, he mentioned that he did not have a proper driving licence at that time and most of his shot involves stepping on the vehicle's brake when given the driver's seat. Unlike Susumu Kurobe, who portrayed Shin Hayata in Ultraman and required one shot to transform into the titular hero, Dan's transformation scene into Ultraseven required two shots and at that time, Kohji was covered in duct tape and the least favorite part in it is when they placed tape in the Ultra Eye, making it "painful" for him to remove it. Along with the show's audiences, he is well aware of Dan and Anne's romantic relationship in the series, but knew that an alien was forbidden to be in love with a human. In his years of acting as Dan Moroboshi and Seven, the most unexpected part was the reveal of Seven's own son, Ultraman Zero.

In his own words, Kohji believed that Ultraseven's lifelong popularity is due to how the show was portrayed as a dark and mature genre and also because of a lot of effort put into motion by the production team despite being a children's show. When asked what were his favorite Ultra Monsters in the series, he replied Eleking, Alien Metron and King Joe: Eleking, because of its appearance in episode 3, which was actually the first episode to be recorded, Alien Metron, due to the (in)famous conversation scene that the alien had with Dan in an apartment during the sunset, and King Joe, because its shooting scene took place on Kobe. In Ultraman Leo, Kohji at first disliked his character for mistreating Gen Ohtori, but eventually came to realize how he wanted to turn Leo into a stronger man.

Heisei Era Ultraman actors Mamoru Miyano (Ultraman Zero) and Hideo Ishiguro (Ultraman Orb) nominated Ultraseven as their favorite Ultra Warrior alongside Ultraman Taro. The reveal of Ultraman Zero as the son of Seven had a huge impact on the audiences.

Popularity
Like Ultraman, Seven has two professional wrestlers who share the same name in the match, Kim Duk (formerly) and Masahiko Takasugi. Both even wear the same masks themed after Seven. In February 2007, a popular internet video called Omoide wa Okkusenman! simultaneously aired in Japan and quickly become a sensation. The song describes the singer reminiscing about his childhood and friends, particularly pretending to be Ultraman and Ultraseven with them, while realizing his life (and theirs) is nothing like what it used to be.

In 2006, a character popularity poll was launched in response to the 40th anniversary of the Ultra Series. Based on Oricon's list, Ultraseven was placed second in the list, according to the voters. He was ranked second place by female voters and first place by male voters. Five years later in the Ultra Series' 45th anniversary, Ultraseven was placed second following his son; Zero scored first place and ranked fourth place in 2013 after losing to Ultraman Tiga.

Ultraseven and his son Zero were the guests of honor in the 2016 Oyako Day, which was held on July 24. Two days prior, the two won the "Parent-Child Grand Prize" by Bruce Osborn.

Merchandise
Due to the popularity of the shape of his eyes and the design of the Ultra Eye, Ultraseven has made multiple collaborations with companies for the release of eyeglasses themed after his eyes or the Ultra Eye, such as JINS and Black Ice. The latter company has Kohji Moritsugu as a guest attendee during the press conference of their product.

Ultraseven is also one of the promoters of  "A MAN of ULTRA", a branch of a fashion house with clothing themed after the Ultra Series. He is also shown promoting the company's products alongside Ultraman and other Ultra Warriors.

In 2009, in conjunction with the promotion of Mega Monster Battle: Ultra Galaxy, Ultraseven and Ultraman Zero were among the promoters of the newly introduced Windows 7. Seven's participation into the press conference is due to his name. Another guest attendance/promoter of the press conference is also voice actress/singer Nana Mizuki, who (like Ultraseven) also had her name being revolved around the aforementioned number.

In January 2013 during Takamiy's concert, a guitar designed with attributes of Ultraseven was sold to a lucky spectator at the price of 2,835,000 yen. In February 2015, a golf item set with Seven's attributes was sold under the price of 49,800 yen.

In 2016, Kaiyodo Co., Ltd (:ja:海洋堂) sold 40 cm-tall figures of Ultraseven in Mega Sofubi Advance, sculpted by Takashi Kinoshita. This figure sold on June 25, 2016 under the price of 18,000 yen.

References
Published materials
 
 

 

Sources

Notes

External links
Ultraseven in Tsuburaya Productions
Dan Moroboshi in Internet Movie Database

Ultra Seven
Ultra Series characters
Fictional giants
Japanese superheroes
Television characters introduced in 1967
Fictional special forces personnel
Fictional shapeshifters
Fictional characters who can teleport
Fictional characters who can change size
Fictional characters with superhuman strength